Arcadia Martin Wesay Toe (born August 20, 1982) is a Liberian footballer who currently plays for LISCR FC.

International career
The striker was also a member of the Liberia national football team.

Notes

External links
 Official site

1982 births
Living people
Liberian footballers
Liberia international footballers
Association football forwards
Expatriate footballers in Libya
Expatriate footballers in Bangladesh
People from Nimba County